The 1965–66 season was the Royals' 21st season overall, and their ninth in Cincinnati. It was also arguably their most exciting, given their outstanding pennant chase in the NBA's Eastern Division, and their hosting of the 1966 NBA All-Star Game in Cincinnati.
The team was still adjusting to the loss of defender Arlen Bockhorn. With the NBA's most wide-open offense, the Royals were again directed by now-legendary Oscar Robertson, who fed shooters Jerry Lucas, Jack Twyman and Adrian Smith when not scoring himself. Forwards Happy Hairston and Tom Hawkins also saw court time, with Lucas sliding into the center spot. Defender Tom Thacker also occasionally got minutes at guard next to Robertson.
The team's outstanding 1965 draft class, one of the NBA's best ever, netted four promising young stars in Nate Bowman, Flynn Robinson, Jon McGlocklin and Bob Love. But Bowman and Robinson battled injuries and illnesses all season long and did not impact the team. Love, a future NBA all-star and Hall of Fame inductee, was cut by coach Jack McMahon.
All-NBA First Teammers Robertson and Lucas each again posted remarkable individual seasons leading the contenders. Robertson again led the NBA in assists while scoring near the 30-point-per game mark and canning his usual pile of free throws at opponents expense. While Robertson averaged '30-10 ', Lucas averaged ' 20-20 ' setting an NBA record for rebounds by a forward that still stands today. Both averaged 44 minutes per game to lead their team.
Despite their contributions, the Royals would finish in third place with a record of 45 wins and 35 losses. In the playoffs, the Royals were again on the verge of ending the Boston Celtics championship reign. The Royals won 2 of the first 3 games in a 5-game series.
Despite the commanding lead, the Celtics would win the next 2 games and eventually claim their 8th straight title.

Regular season

Season standings

Record vs. opponents

Game log

Playoffs

|- align="center" bgcolor="#ccffcc"
| 1
| March 23
| @ Boston
| W 107–103
| Smith, Robertson (26)
| Jerry Lucas (27)
| Oscar Robertson (3)
| Boston Garden9,510
| 1–0
|- align="center" bgcolor="#ffcccc"
| 2
| March 26
| Boston
| L 125–132
| Oscar Robertson (35)
| Jerry Lucas (24)
| Oscar Robertson (11)
| Cincinnati Gardens10,027
| 1–1
|- align="center" bgcolor="#ccffcc"
| 3
| March 27
| @ Boston
| W 113–107
| Robertson, Lucas (27)
| Jerry Lucas (16)
| Adrian Smith (6)
| Boston Garden13,571
| 2–1
|- align="center" bgcolor="#ffcccc"
| 4
| March 30
| Boston
| L 103–120
| Oscar Robertson (34)
| Jerry Lucas (17)
| Oscar Robertson (11)
| Cincinnati Gardens12,107
| 2–2
|- align="center" bgcolor="#ffcccc"
| 5
| April 1
| @ Boston
| L 103–112
| Oscar Robertson (37)
| Jerry Lucas (17)
| Oscar Robertson (9)
| Boston Garden13,909
| 2–3
|-

Awards and honors
 Oscar Robertson –  First Team All-NBA,
 Jerry Lucas – First Team All-NBA,
 Adrian Smith, MVP of the 1966 NBA All-Star Game, held in Cincinnati.

References

 Royals on Basketball Reference

Sacramento Kings seasons
Cincinnati
Cincinnati
Cincinnati